Autumn Spring is a 2001 Czech drama film directed by Vladimír Michálek.

Cast
 Vlastimil Brodský - František Hána („Fanda“)
 Stella Zázvorková - Emílie Hánová
 Stanislav Zindulka - Eduard Stará („Eda“)
 Ondřej Vetchý - Jaroslav Hána („Jára“)
 Zita Kabátová - Maruška Grulichová
 Petra Špalková - Králová
 Jiří Lábus - Estate agent

References

External links 

2001 drama films
2001 films
Czech Lion Awards winners (films)
Golden Kingfisher winners
Czech drama films
2000s Czech-language films
2000s Czech films